Battersby is a railway station on the Esk Valley Line, which runs between Middlesbrough and Whitby via Nunthorpe. It is owned by Network Rail and managed by Northern Trains.

History 

Battersby is unusual on the British railway network, due to the layout of the tracks. Until the rationalisation of the signalling in 1989 it was common for two trains to do so at the same time, in order to pass each other on the single track Esk Valley line. Trains can still pass each other in the one remaining platform, using the "first in, last out" principle, as the platform line is signalled to permit two trains to occupy it at once.

In its early years Battersby was known as Ingleby Junction, and opened on the Picton to Grosmont line in 1858 when the Ingleby Mining company's private line first linked to the North Yorkshire & Cleveland Railway. The station was renamed to Battersby Junction in 1878 to avoid confusion with Ingleby station, on the Picton Branch, which ran from Battersby to the main line at Picton. The station was simplified to "Battersby" in 1893 (The NER had a dislike of "Junction" suffixes and removed most of them). Despite being located along single track routes, Battersby became a major hub with extensive marshalling sidings and three-road engine shed with turntable. Two terraces with 30 cottages along with two houses were built and still stand today.

Battersby used to have three platforms: two long through platforms connected by a central footbridge and a shorter bay platform with a run-round loop. Water towers were located at both ends of the station. Only the one at the current "junction end" remains today. The signal box located here has long since vanished, but traces of the third platform are still visible and a run-round loop is available for loco-hauled trains.

Services 

As of the May 2021 timetable change, the station is served by six trains per day (four on Sunday) towards Whitby. Heading towards Middlesbrough via Nunthorpe, there are eight trains per day (four on Sunday). Most trains continue to Newcastle via Hartlepool. All services are operated by Northern Trains.

Rolling stock used: Class 156 Super Sprinter and Class 158 Express Sprinter

See also
 Rosedale Railway

References

External links 

Railway stations in North Yorkshire
DfT Category F2 stations
Former North Eastern Railway (UK) stations
Railway stations in Great Britain opened in 1858
Northern franchise railway stations
Railway depots in Yorkshire